The People's Republic of China competed at the 1996 Summer Olympics in Atlanta, United States. 294 competitors, 111 men and 183 women, took part in 155 events in 25 sports.

Medalists

Archery

The People's Republic of China sent three men and three women to Atlanta for archery. As usual, the Chinese women were the more successful squad, with He Ying winning a silver medal. They went a combined 9-3 in individual competition as opposed the men's 1-3 record. They also won their first team match before being defeated.

Women's Individual Competition:
 He Ying → Final, Silver Medal (5-1)
 Wang Xiaozhu → Quarterfinal, 7th place (3-1)
 Yang Jianping → Round of 32, 29th place (1-1)

Men's Individual Competition:
 Tang Hua → Round of 32, 23rd place (1-1)
 Luo Hengyu → Round of 64, 36th place (0-1)
 Shen Jun → Round of 64, 40th place (0-1)

Women's Team Competition:
 He, Wang, and Yang → Quarterfinal, 6th place (1-1)

Men's Team Competition:
 Tang, Luo, and Shen → Round of 16, 12th place (0-1)

Athletics

Men's 100 metres
 Chen Wenzhong

Men's 200 metres
 Chen Wenzhong

Men's 110 metres Hurdles
 Li Tong
 Chen Yanhao

Men's 20 km Walk
 Yu Guohui
 Li Zewen
 Li Mingcai

Men's 50 km Walk 
 Zhang Huiqiang
 Final — 3:53:10 (→ 14th place)
 Mao Xinyuan
 Final — DSQ (→ no ranking)
 Zhao Yongsheng
 Final — DSQ (→ no ranking)

Men's Long Jump
 Huang Geng
 Qualification — 8.12 m
 Final — 7.99 m (→ 9th place)
 Chen Jing
 Qualification — 7.70 m (→ did not advance, 29th place)

Men's triple jump
Zou Sixin
 Qualification — 16.53 m (→ did not advance, 21st place)

Men's Discus Throw 
 Li Shaojie
 Qualification — 60.20 m (→ did not advance)

Men's Javelin Throw 
 Zhang Lianbiao
 Qualification — 79.88 m
 Final — 80.96 m (→ 11th place)

Women's 400 metres
 Du Xiujie
 Heat — 53.95 (→ did not advance)

Women's 10,000 metres 
 Wang Junxia
 Qualification — 32:36.53
 Final — 31:02.58 (→  Silver Medal)
 Wang Mingxia
 Qualification — 32:10.26
 Final — 32:38.98 (→ 15th place)
 Yang Siju
 Qualification — 32:22.77
 Final — 33:15.29 (→ 19th place)

Women's Javelin Throw
 Li Lei
 Qualification — 61.48 m
 Final — 60.74 m (→ 8th place)

Women's Discus Throw 
 Xiao Yanling
 Qualification — 65.10m
 Final — 64.72m (→ 5th place)

Women's Shot Put
 Sui Xinmei
 Qualification — 19.36m
 Final — 19.88m (→  Silver Medal)
 Li Meisu 
 Qualification — 18.39m (→ did not advance)
 Huang Zhihong 
 Qualification — did not start (→ did not advance)

Women's Triple Jump
 Ren Ruiping
 Qualification — 14.56m
 Final — 14.30m (→ 7th place)
 Wang Xiangrong — 13.32m (→ did not advance)

Women's Marathon
 Ren Xiujuan — 2:31.21 (→ 9th place)

Women's 10 km Walk
 Wang Yan — 42:19 (→  Bronze Medal)
 Gu Yan — 42:34 (→ 4th place)
 Gao Hongmiao — dsq (→ no ranking)

Badminton

Basketball

Men's tournament

Team roster
Mengke Bateer
Gong Xiaobin
Hu Weidong
Li Nan
Li Xiaoyong
Liu Yudong
Shan Tao
Sun Jun
Wang Zhizhi
Wu Naiqun
Wu Qinglong
Zheng Wu
Preliminary round

Quarterfinals

Classification Round 5–8th Place

7th Place match

Women's tournament

Team roster
Zheng Dongmei
Liang Xin
Zheng Haixia
He Jun
Ma Zongqing
Miao Bo
Li Xin
Liu Jun
Shen Li
Chu Hui
Li Dongmei
Ma Chengqing
Preliminary round

Classification Round 9th−12th place

9th place match

Boxing

Men's Light Flyweight (– 48 kg)
Yang Xiangzhong
 First Round — Defeated Alberto Rossel (Peru), 16-7 
 Second Round — Lost to Hamid Berhili (Morocco), 9-14

Men's Middleweight (– 75 kg)
Chen Tao
 First Round — Lost to Hirokuni Moto (Japan), 10-15

Men's Heavyweight (– 91 kg)
Jiang Tao
 First Round — Bye
 Second Round — Defeated Charles Kizza (Uganda), 10-7 
 Quarterfinals — Lost to Nate Jones (United States), 4-21

Canoeing

Cycling

Women's Individual Road Race
Guo Xinghong 
 Final — 02:49:47 (→ 41st place)
Zhao Haijuan 
 Final — did not finish (→ no ranking)

Women's Mountainbike Cross Country
 Gao Hongying
 Final — 2:09.08 (→ 25th place)

Diving

Men's 3m Springboard
Xiong Ni
 Preliminary Heat — 463.02
 Semi Final — 231.45
 Final — 470.01 (→  Gold Medal)
Yu Zhuocheng
 Preliminary Heat — 438.93
 Semi Final — 223.41
 Final — 467.52 (→  Silver Medal)

Women's 3m Springboard
Fu Mingxia
 Preliminary Heat — 284.28
 Semi Final — 221.49
 Final — 326.19 (→  Gold Medal)
Tan Shuping
 Preliminary Heat — 212.49 (→ did not advance, 23rd place)

Women's 10m Platform
Fu Mingxia
 Preliminary Heat — 329.25 
 Semi Final — 179.94 
 Final — 341.64 (→  Gold Medal)
Guo Jingjing
 Preliminary Heat — 315.39 
 Semi Final — 177.30 
 Final — 269.91 (→ 5th place)

Fencing

Nine fencers, five men and four women, represented China in 1996.

Men's foil
 Ye Chong
 Wang Haibin
 Dong Zhaozhi

Men's team foil
 Ye Chong, Dong Zhaozhi, Wang Haibin

Men's épée
 Zhao Gang

Men's sabre
 Yan Xiandong

Women's foil
 Xiao Aihua
 Liang Jun
 Wang Huifeng

Women's team foil
 Liang Jun, Wang Huifeng, Xiao Aihua

Women's épée
 Yan Jing

Football

Gymnastics

Li Xiaoshuang
 Gold Medal, Individual All-around, China's first in this category

Handball

Judo

Rhythmic gymnastics

Rowing

Sailing

Shooting

Softball

Women's Team Competition
Preliminary Round Robin
Defeated Australia (6:0)
Lost to Japan (0:3)
Defeated Canada (2:1)
Defeated Puerto Rico (10:0)
Defeated Netherlands (8:0)
Defeated Chinese Taipei (1:0)
Lost to United States (2:3)
Semifinals
Lost to United States (0:1)
Bronze Medal Match
Defeated Australia (4:2) 
Final
Lost to United States (1:3) →  Silver Medal
Team Roster
Wei Qiang
Tao Hua
Xu Jian
Zhang Chunfang
Yan Fang
Wang Ying
An Zhongxin
Wang Lihong
Chen Hong
He Liping
Lei Li
Liu Xuqing
Liu Yaju
Ma Ying
Ou Jingbai
Head coach: Li Minkuan

Swimming

Men's 50 m Freestyle
 Jiang Chengji
 Heat – 22.55
 Final – 22.33 (→ 4th place)

Men's 100 m Freestyle
 Zhao Lifeng
 Heat – 51.70 (→ did not advance, 40th place)

Men's 100 m Backstroke
 Zhao Yi
 Heat – 57.17 (→ did not advance, 27th place)

Men's 100 m Breaststroke
 Zeng Qiliang
 Heat – 1:02.26
 Final – 1:02.01 (→ 7th place)

Men's 200 m Breaststroke
 Wang Yiwu
 Heat – 1:02.26 (→ did not advance, 23rd place)

Men's 100 m Butterfly
 Jiang Chengji
 Heat – 53.40
 Final – 53.20 (→ 4th place)

Men's 4 × 100 m Medley Relay
Zhao Yi, Zeng Qiliang, Jiang Chengji, and Zhao Lifeng
 Heat – 3:43.50 (→ did not advance, 13th place)

Women's 50 m Freestyle
 Le Jingyi
 Heat – 25.10
 Final – 24.90 (→  Silver Medal)
 Shan Ying
 Heat – 25.71
 Final – 25.70 (→ 7th place)

Women's 100 m Freestyle
 Le Jingyi
 Heat – 54.90
 Final – 54.50 (→  Gold Medal)
 Shan Ying
 Heat – 56.10
 B-Final – 55.74 (→ 9th place)

Women's 200 m Freestyle
 Chen Yan
 Heat – 2:03.32
 B-Final – scratched
 Shan Ying
 Heat – 2:04.29 (→ did not advance, 23rd place)

Women's 400 m Freestyle
 Chen Yan
 Heat – 4:22.55 (→ did not advance, 29th place)

Women's 800 m Freestyle
 Pu Yiqi
 Heat – 8:45.32 (→ did not advance, 12th place)
              
Women's 100 m Backstroke
 Chen Yan
 Heat – 1:02.62 
 Final – 1:02.50 (→ 5th place)
 He Cihong
 Heat – 1:05.87 (→ did not advance, 26th place)

Women's 200 m Backstroke
 Chen Yan
 Heat – 2:14.74 
 B-Final – 2:14.37 (→ 11th place)
 Wu Yanyan
 Heat – 2:20.89 (→ did not advance, 28th place)

Women's 100 m Breaststroke
 Han Xue
 Heat – 1:10.40 
 B-Final – 1:09.90 (→ 11th place)
 Yuan Yuan
 Heat – 1:11.65 (→ did not advance, 24th place)

Women's 200 m Breaststroke
 Lin Li
 Heat – 2:30.64
 B-Final – 2:33.45 (→ 16th place)
 Yuan Yuan
 Heat – 2:33.89 (→ did not advance, 24th place)

Women's 100 m Butterfly
 Liu Limin
 Heat – 1:00.18
 Final – 59.14 (→  Silver Medal)
 Cai Huijue
 Heat – 1:00.89
 Final – 1:00.46 (→ 7th place)

Women's 200 m Butterfly
 Qu Yun
 Heat – 2:11.35
 Final – 2:10.26(→ 4th place)
 Liu Limin
 Heat – 2:13.12
 Final – 2:10.70 (→ 5th place)

Women's 200 m Individual Medley
 Lin Li
 Heat – 2:16.31
 Final – 2:14.74 (→  Bronze Medal)
 Wu Yanyan
 Heat – 2:16.55
 B-Final – 2:16.61 (→ 10th place)

Women's 400 m Individual Medley
 Chen Yan
 Heat – 4:53.87 (→ did not advance, 17th place)
 Wu Yanyan
 Heat – 4:54.07 (→ did not advance, 18th place)

Women's 4 × 100 m Freestyle Relay
Shan Ying, Chao Na, Nian Yun, and Le Jingyi 
 Heat – 3:44.06
Le Jingyi, Chao Na, Nian Yun, and Shan Ying
 Final – 3:40.48 (→  Silver Medal)

Women's 4 × 200 m Freestyle Relay
Chen Yan, Pu Yiqi, Wang Luna, and Nian Yun
 Heat – 8:13.29
Nian Yun, Wang Luna, Chen Yan, and Shan Ying
 Final – 8:15.38 (→ 8th place)

Women's 4 × 100 m Medley Relay
Chen Yan, Han Xue, Cai Huijue, and Shan Ying
 Heat – 4:09.23
Chen Yan, Han Xue, Cai Huijue, and Shan Ying
 Final – 4:07.34 (→  Bronze Medal)

Synchronized swimming

Table tennis

Tennis

Women's Singles Competition
 Yi Jingqian
 First round — Lost to Inés Gorrochategui (Argentina) 2-6 6-1 1-6
 Chen Li-Ling
 First round — Lost to Monica Seles (United States) 0-6 4-6

Volleyball

Women's Indoor Team Competition
Preliminary round (group A)
 Defeated Netherlands (3-0)
 Defeated South Korea (3-2)
 Defeated United States (3-1)
 Defeated Ukraine (3-0)
 Defeated Japan (3-0)
Quarterfinals
 Defeated Germany (3-0)
Semifinals
 Defeated Russia (3-1)
Final
 Lost to Cuba (1-3) (→  Silver Medal)
Team Roster
Cui Yongmei 
He Qi 
Lai Yawen 
Li Xan 
Liu Xiaoning 
Pan Wenli 
Sun Yue 
Wang Lina 
Wang Yi 
Wang Ziling 
Wu Yongmei 
Zhu Yunying 
Head coach: Lang Ping

Weightlifting

Men's 108 kg
Cui Wenhua  
Snatch — 190.0 kg
Clean & Jerk — 215.0 kg
Total — 405.0 kg (→ 5th place)

Wrestling

References

External links

Nations at the 1996 Summer Olympics
1996
Olympics